Zap or ZAP may refer to:

Places
 Zap the Blackstone River, US
 Zap, North Dakota, US
 Zhuozhou East railway station, China Railway telegraph code ZAP
 The Zap, now The Arch, a nightclub in Brighton, England
Great Zab, a river in Turkey and Iraq
Little Zab, a river in Iran and Iraq

Arts and entertainment

Comics
 Zap Comix, an underground comics series founded by Robert Crumb in 1968

Fictional characters
 Zap (G.I. Joe), in the G.I. Joe universe
 Zap Rowsdower, in the 1990 film The Final Sacrifice
 Zap Zodiac, a 2005 Beano comic strip character

Other
 ZAP (satellite television), a digital satellite television operator in Portuguese-speaking sub-Saharan Africa
 Zap! Snowboarding Trix, a 1997 video game
 Z.A.P., a 2008 video game by GarageGames
 "Zap", a 1986 instrumental by Eric Johnson from Tones
 Zap.com, a 1998-2000 website run by Zapata Corporation, now known as HRG Group

Science and technology 
 ZAP File, a computer file extension
 OWASP ZAP, a web application security tool
 Zinc finger antiviral protein in mammals
 Zoster-associated pain, a symptom of herpes zoster (shingles)
 ZAP, an instruction mnemonic in IBM Basic assembly language
 Zap Energy, an American company that aims to commercialize fusion power

Transportation
 ZAP (motor company), an American electric vehicle maker
 Zap flap, a type of aircraft wing flap
 Titan Airways (callsign)

Other uses
 Zap (action), a form of political direct action
 AGR-14 ZAP, a US Navy air-to-surface unguided rocket
 Raye Hollitt (born 1964), American bodybuilder known as Zap on the TV show American Gladiators
 Zapotec languages (ISO 639-3 and 639-2 codes), spoken in Mexico
 Zenith Applied Philosophy, a New Zealand sect of Scientology
 Zero Aggression Principle, a personal philosophy

See also
 Zapp (disambiguation)
 Zapper (disambiguation)
 Záviš of Zápy or Záviš ze Zap (c. 1350–c. 1411), Bohemian theologian and composer
 ZZZap!, a 1990s British TV programme for deaf children